The Whispering Chorus is a 1918 American silent psychological drama film directed by Cecil B. DeMille. It is the first and earliest film considered a psychological drama.

Plot
John Tremble (Hatton), an impoverished cashier in a contracting concern, listens to the voice of evil and succumbs to temptation, stealing $1000 from his employer. When he begins to fear detection, he runs away and hides on an isolated island where he becomes a piece of human driftwood. While fishing he finds the body of a dead man and, again listening to the voice of evil, he exchanges clothes and then mutilates the head of the corpse, to suggest he himself has been murdered. The finding of the body is reported to his family and Tremble begins life anew. The police search for the murderer and Tremble is finally brought to trial. Meanwhile, Jane Tremble (Williams), his former wife, has married the state governor and does not recognize John Tremble when she sees him in court. After a dramatic trial, John Tremble is found guilty of his own murder. He nobly meets death in the electric chair rather than bring unhappiness to his former wife.

Cast
 Raymond Hatton as John Tremble
 Kathlyn Williams as Jane Tremble
 Edythe Chapman as John Tremble's mother
 Elliott Dexter as George Coggeswell
 Noah Beery as Longshoreman
 Guy Oliver as Chief McFarland
 John Burton as Charles Barden
 Tully Marshall as F.P. Clumley
 William H. Brown as Stauberry
 James Neill as Channing
 Gustav von Seyffertitz as Mocking Face
 Walter Lynch as Evil Face
 Edna Mae Cooper as Good Face
 Julia Faye as Girl in Shanghai Dive (uncredited)
 Jack Mulhall as Priest (uncredited)
 Charles Ogle as Judge (uncredited)

Reception
Like many American films of the time, The Whispering Chorus was subject to cuts by city and state film censorship boards. For example, the Chicago Board of Censors cut, in Reel 2, a closeup of the alteration of the ledger, theft of money, Reel 4, striking man in face with bottle, two scenes of young woman in kimono enticing man and pulling him towards room, Reel 5, policeman striking man in face twice, and, Reel 7, two scenes of pulling lever for electric chair.

See also
The House That Shadows Built (1931 promotional film by Paramount)

References

External links

Kramer, Fritzi (February 9, 2014), The Whispering Chorus (1918) A Silent Film Review (with stills)

1918 films
1918 drama films
American silent feature films
American black-and-white films
American psychological drama films
Films directed by Cecil B. DeMille
Articles containing video clips
1910s English-language films
1910s American films
Silent American drama films